Robert Allen (1847 - 1927) was a Welsh Baptist minister. He was raised and spent most of his life in the Glamorganshire area.

References 

19th-century Welsh Baptist ministers
1847 births
1927 deaths
20th-century Welsh Baptist ministers